Mick Wishofer (born 8 October 1999) is an Austrian racing driver who currently competes in the ADAC GT Masters for Emil Frey Racing.

Career

Karting 
Wishofer started karting in 2008. His accolades include winning the Rotax Max Challenge Austria and Rotax Max Challenge Hungary in 2011. In that year he also came second in the Mini-Max class of the Rotax Max Challenge Central-Eastern Europe.

Formula 4 
In 2017 Wishofer made his debut in single-seater racing by joining Lechner Racing in the ADAC Formula 4 Championship. He dominantly won the Rookies' Championship by taking 11 rookie-class wins out of 21 races.

For the 2018 season he joined US Racing–CHRS. At the Hockenheimring he collected his maiden race win. He finished the season in 6th place with 6 podium finishes to his name.

ADAC GT Masters 
In 2019 he made his GT racing debut in the ADAC GT Masters. He started for Team Zakspeed BKK Mobil Oil Racing in a Mercedes-AMG GT3 with Kelvin Snoeks being his teammate. The pair reached the podium once in the final round of the season at the Sachsenring. At the end of season the two occupied 23rd place in the standings.

In 2020 Wishofer stayed with the same team. At the Lausitzring he collected his first race win in the ADAC GT Masters together with his teammate Dorian Boccolacci.

In 2021 he started for MRS GT-Racing in a Porsche 911 GT3 R. In the opening round of the season at the Motorsport Arena Oschersleben he achieved a single podium finish together with Maximilian Hackländer. After the first four rounds of the season Wishofer was replaced by Erik Johansson.

In 2022 he joined Emil Frey Racing driving in a Lamborghini Huracán GT3 Evo together with Konsta Lappalainen. In the third round at Circuit Zandvoort the pair took their first win of the season.

Racing record

Career summary

Complete ADAC Formula 4 Championship results
(key) (Races in bold indicate pole position) (Races in italics indicate fastest lap)

References

External links 

 Mick Wishofer at DriverDB
 Official website

1999 births
Living people
Austrian racing drivers
Sportspeople from Vienna
ADAC Formula 4 drivers
ADAC GT Masters drivers
Walter Lechner Racing drivers
US Racing drivers
Charouz Racing System drivers
Emil Frey Racing drivers
Toksport WRT drivers